Timothy Bakale (born 29 March 1995) is a Solomon Islands footballer who plays as a midfielder for Western United. He was named to the national squad making his debut for the national team on October 8, 2016 in their 1-0 loss against New Caledonia.

References

Living people
1995 births
Association football defenders
Solomon Islands international footballers
Solomon Islands footballers
Marist F.C. players